Knut Leo Abrahamsen (born 2 September 1962) is a Norwegian Nordic combined skier. He was born in Alta, and represented the club Alta IF. He competed at the 1988 Winter Olympics in Calgary, where he placed 26th.

References

External links

1962 births
Living people
People from Alta, Norway
Norwegian male Nordic combined skiers
Olympic Nordic combined skiers of Norway
Nordic combined skiers at the 1988 Winter Olympics
Sportspeople from Troms og Finnmark